= Mories Atoki =

Nigerian lawyer and business executive

Mories Atoki is a Nigerian lawyer and business executive. She was appointed as the CEO at African Business Coalition For Health (ABC Health) in May 2020. Atoki has a certificate in Innovating for Sustainability from the Harvard Business School, and is a graduate of the London School of Business & Finance. Before her appointment at ABC Health, she worked at PricewaterhouseCoopers, where she led the Sustainability and Climate change team.

== Personal life ==
Atoki has said that her loss of a child motivated her to transition to a career in business development.
